The 2022 OFC U-20 Women's Championship, originally to be held as the 2021 OFC U-19 Women's Championship, will be the 10th edition of the OFC U-19/U-20 Women's Championship, the biennial international youth football championship organised by the Oceania Football Confederation (OFC) for the women's under-19/under-20 national teams of Oceania. The host country of the tournament has yet to be announced. The winner of the tournament will qualify for the 2022 FIFA U-20 Women's World Cup in Costa Rica as the OFC representatives.

The tournament was originally scheduled to be held in July 2021. However, the OFC announced on 4 March 2021 that it had been postponed due to the COVID-19 pandemic, pending FIFA's confirmation of dates of the 2022 FIFA U-20 Women's World Cup. On 4 June 2021, the OFC announced that the tournament had been rescheduled to April 2022, with the name of the tournament changed from "2021 OFC U-19 Women's Championship" to "2022 OFC U-20 Women's Championship".

New Zealand are the seven-time defending champions.

Teams
All 11 FIFA-affiliated national teams from OFC are eligible to enter the tournament.

Venue
To be confirmed.

Squads

Players born on or after 1 January 2002 are eligible to compete in the tournament.

Qualified teams for FIFA U-20 Women's World Cup
The following team from OFC qualify for the 2022 FIFA U-20 Women's World Cup.

1 Bold indicates champions for that year. Italic indicates hosts for that year.

References

External links
OFC U-19 Women's Championship 2021, at Oceania Football Confederation

2022
2022 FIFA U-20 Women's World Cup qualification
2022 in women's association football
2022 in youth association football
U-19 Women's Championship
Association football events postponed due to the COVID-19 pandemic